Stefan Edberg defeated the defending champion Boris Becker in the final, 4–6, 7–6, 6–3, 6–1 to win the singles title at the 1989 Nabisco Masters.

Draw

Finals

Round robin

Rod Laver group
Standings are determined by: 1. number of wins; 2. number of matches; 3. in two-players-ties, head-to-head records; 4. in three-players-ties, percentage of sets won, or of games won; 5. steering-committee decision.

Ilie Năstase group
Standings are determined by: 1. number of wins; 2. number of matches; 3. in two-players-ties, head-to-head records; 4. in three-players-ties, percentage of sets won, or of games won; 5. steering-committee decision.

See also
ATP World Tour Finals appearances

Singles